Alvania weinkauffi is a species of minute sea snail, a marine gastropod mollusk or micromollusk in the family Rissoidae.

Subspecies
 Alvania weinkauffi jacobusi Oliverio, Amati & Nofroni, 1986
 Alvania weinkauffi weinkauffi (Weinkauff, 1868)

Description

Distribution
This species occurs in European waters.

References

 Gofas, S.; Le Renard, J.; Bouchet, P. (2001). Mollusca, in: Costello, M.J. et al. (Ed.) (2001). European register of marine species: a check-list of the marine species in Europe and a bibliography of guides to their identification. Collection Patrimoines Naturels, 50: pp. 180–213

Rissoidae
Gastropods described in 1868